RFN or Rfn may refer to:

Rainforest Foundation Norway
Rifleman
Russian Federation Navy
FMN riboswitch (also known as RFN element)